Ceccaldi is a surname. Notable people with the surname include:

Charles Ceccaldi-Raynaud (born 1925), French politician, father of Charles Ceccaldi-Raynaud
Daniel Ceccaldi (1927–2003), French actor
Joëlle Ceccaldi-Raynaud (born 1951), French politician, daughter of Charles Ceccaldi-Raynaud
Théo Ceccaldi (born 1986), French composer, jazz violinist and viola player